The Whole Experience (WXP Games) is an independent video game developer based in Seattle, Washington.
The company was founded by Patrick Moynihan, Jeff Connelly, Sky Kensok and Lyndon Sumner around 1995.

Video games 
WXP-developed games include:
The Lord of the Rings: The Fellowship of the Ring (2002) for Xbox (Black Label Games)Greg Hastings Tournament Paintball (2004) for Xbox (Activision)Greg Hastings Tournament Paintball MAX'D ( 2005) for Xbox, PS2, GBA and DS (Activision)Scene It? Lights, Camera, Action (2007) for Xbox 360, which was an AIAS nominee for 2007 Family Game of the Year.Daring Game For Girls ( 2009) for Nintendo Wii and Nintendo DS (2009-2010 Majesco Entertainment)
 Xotic (2011) on Steam (Valcon Games)

WXP has also performed work for Walt Disney (Cyberspace Mountain at DisneyQuest), Microsoft, NVIDIA, Zombie Studios (Spearhead'') and Sierra Online.

External links 
 WXP Games 
 Greg Hastings Tournament Paintball
 GHTP User Forum
 Official Activision page for Greg Hastings Tournament Paintball
 Official Activision page for Greg Hastings Tournament Paintball MAX'D
 Official Xbox page for Scene It? Lights, Camera, Action

Video game companies of the United States
Video game development companies